Classificatie van verrichtingen is a Dutch system of health coding procedures.

It is based on ICD-9-CM (the International Classification of Diseases, Clinical Modification), but not identical to it.

It is abbreviated "CvV".

References

External links
 https://web.archive.org/web/20120324141653/http://www.hsmr.nl/faq/veelgestelde-vragen-codering

Clinical procedure classification
Healthcare in the Netherlands